The 2013–14 Kategoria e Parë was competed between 16 teams started on 31 August 2013 and finished on 10 May 2014.

Changes from last season

Team changes

From Kategoria e Parë
Promoted to Kategoria Superiore:
 Lushnja
 Partizani

Relegated to Kategoria e Dytë:
 Besëlidhja
 Iliria
 Gramshi
 Naftëtari

To Kategoria e Parë
Relegated from Kategoria Superiore:
 Shkumbini
 Tomori
 Luftëtari
 Apolonia

Promoted from Kategoria e Dytë:
 Veleçiku
 Albpetrol

League table

Top scorers

Foreign players

References

2013-14
2
Alba